Mike Bivins is alleged domestic terrorist and former multimedia journalist based out of Portland, Oregon, whose reporting about civil unrest in the United States has itself been the object of news coverage.

Early life and education
While he was born in Washington's Tri-Cities, Bivins has lived in Portland for most of his life. Bivins attended Benson High School.

Journalism career
Bivins was interviewed by the Washington Post about his coverage of the 2016 Portland, Oregon riots, where car windows were smashed and fires were lit in protest of Donald Trump winning the 2016 presidential election.

In an interview with Spokane's alt-weekly, The Inlander, about his coverage of the 2016 riots, Bivins said that via his use of social media applications such as Periscope he is able to compete directly with large news organizations, some of whom have purchased his footage. Bivins is quoted in The Inlander as saying: "I've put my phone in my mouth.... And I'll crawl up onto high spots and get a better vantage point easier, because I don't have a big camera weighing me down."

on July 7, 2016 Bivins captured Periscope footage of subsequently jailed conservative blogger Michael Strickland pointing a gun at numerous protesters during a Black Lives Matter protest in Portland. In a televised interview with KGW the following day, Bivins described the incident as "surreal," and said that he was unsure of how to react once the gun was put away by Strickland.

Bivins' coverage of an open-carry protest at the Oregon Statehouse, where supporters of Malheur Refuge occupier Ammon Bundy hung and burned an effigy of Oregon Governor Kate Brown, was mentioned in Eugene Weekly's Slant column:

As Bivins points out in his story this week, the effigy of Brown that was burned made reference to the Malheur occupation; when angry people flaunting weapons go stomping around the halls of government, we need to take note, especially since Oct. 1 marks the first anniversary of the Umpqua Community College shooting in which nine people, as well as the shooter, died as a result of gun violence.

KXRY program 5 Quadrants of PDX had Bivins on as a guest to talk about an article he co-wrote for Willamette Week covering the uptick in incidents involving white supremacists in the Portland area. On the program, Bivins talked about recent Ku Klux Klan activity at a local rally for president Donald Trump, as well as a group of self-described National Socialists being kicked out of a Portland bar.
United States Senator Ron Wyden cited Bivins' Willamette Week article on March 16, 2017 when announcing his support for recently introduced  anti-hate legislation.

Arrest
On May 7, 2022 Bivins was arrested on suspicion of multiple crimes, including felony arson and vandalism, related to a string of incidents targeting mosques and synagogues in Portland.

References

Journalists from Portland, Oregon
Living people
Year of birth missing (living people)